Typhlocybinae is a subfamily of insects in the leafhopper family, Cicadellidae. This is currently the second largest leafhopper subfamily based on the number of described species, but researchers believe there are so many taxa yet undescribed that it is probably the largest subfamily. Approximately 6000 species have been described to science so far.

Tribes
Entomologists divide the subfamily into four to ten tribes. Five tribes are generally accepted:
Alebrini
Dikraneurini
Empoascini
Erythroneurini
Typhlocybini

Selected genera 
 Alebra
Dikrella
 Dziwneono
 Empoasca
 Erasmoneura Young, 1952
 Eupteryx
 Jacobiasca
 Sweta Viraktamath & Dietrich, 2011
 Typhlocyba

Gallery

References 

 
Cicadellidae